San Juan Bautista de Ñeembucú (Guaraní: San Juan Bautista del Ñe'embuku) is a village and distrito in the Ñeembucú department of Paraguay.

Sources 
World Gazeteer: Paraguay – World-Gazetteer.com

Populated places in the Ñeembucú Department